Fernando Calcaterra (born August 19, 1972 in Casilda (Santa Fe), Argentina) is a former Argentine footballer who competed for clubs in Argentina, Chile, México, Peru and Venezuela.

Teams
  Newell's Old Boys 1992-1995
  Platense 1995
  O'Higgins 1995-1996
  Caracas 1997
  Deportivo Morón 1997-1998
  Club Deportivo Municipal 1998
  Sport Boys 1999-2000
  Yucatan 2001-2003

References
 
 

1972 births
Living people
Argentine footballers
Argentine expatriate footballers
Club Atlético Platense footballers
Newell's Old Boys footballers
O'Higgins F.C. footballers
Caracas FC players
Sport Boys footballers
Chilean Primera División players
Argentine Primera División players
Expatriate footballers in Chile
Expatriate footballers in Mexico
Expatriate footballers in Peru
Expatriate footballers in Venezuela
Association footballers not categorized by position
People from Casilda
Sportspeople from Santa Fe Province